Tsentral'naya Hill is a bare rock hill (205 m) in the central part of the Schirmacher Hills, Queen Maud Land. The feature was mapped by the Soviet Antarctic Expedition in 1961 and named Gora Tsentral'naya (central hill).

Hills of Queen Maud Land
Princess Astrid Coast